The John Goddard House is a historic house at 235 Goddard Avenue in Brookline, Massachusetts, US. The two-story wood-frame house was originally built by Joseph Goddard in 1670 and re-built by his grandson John Goddard in 1767, a farmer. It is one of the few 18th-century houses in Brookline, important for the role it and its owner played in the American Revolutionary War during the Siege of Boston in 1776. The house was added to the National Register of Historic Places in 1985.

Description and history
The Goddard House is set on the north side of Goddard Avenue, opposite the northern border of Larz Anderson Park in southeastern Brookline. It is a roughly square wood-frame house, with a hip roof, central chimney, and a three-bay facade with a projecting gabled vestibule. The interior retains period fixtures, including wall paneling, doors, and hardware.

The house was built in 1767 by John Goddard on land originally purchased by his grandfather Joseph. Goddard, a teamster, was active in local civic affairs, notably serving in the Massachusetts Provincial Congress prior to the American Revolutionary War in 1775. Goddard's property was one of several places in Massachusetts used by rebellious colonists for the storage of munitions (probably in the barn, since demolished). During the Siege of Boston, Goddard acted as wagon-master general to the Continental Army during the Fortification of Dorchester Heights, a night-time act that required the wagons to be rendered as quiet as possible to avoid notice. After the siege lifted and the British troops left Boston, Goddard refused George Washington's offer to remain in military service due to his duty to his large family.

John and Hannah Goddard, A Sermon
Sermon preached in the First Parish Meeting House, Brookline, Mass. USA; by William H. Lyon D.D. in dedication of the Stained-Glass Window in memory of John and Hannah Goddard.

The evacuation of Boston on the seventeenth of March 1776, was the greatest victory which the Continental troops had gained up to that date. Nearly a year had passed since the days of Lexington and Concord, and just nine months since Bunker Hill. The attempt to conquer Canada had failed disastrously, and the eyes of the combatants on both sides of the ocean were directed to the struggle in and around Boston. There had seemed little prospect of American success when the siege began, and as time passed and no change in the condition had been affected, the prospect did not grow brighter.

When the spring began to open, however, Washington began to stir, and the result was a feat of engineering which both astonished and dismayed the too confident enemy.

On Monday night, March 4, a heavy cannonade was opened upon Boston from Roxbury, which was as hotly returned by the enemy, who had no suspicion of what it covered About seven o'clock two thousand men marched to Dorchester Heights. Eight hundred formed an advance guard, followed by carts with intrenching tools, then came twelve hundred more troops, and last of all a train of three hundred wagons, carrying facines and hay. Every possible precaution had been taken to prevent discovery. The wheels of the carts were wound with hay, and the oxen shod with felt, and no whips were allowed to be used, the poor uninterested beasts being prodded along with sharpened sticks. So, though there was a bright moonlight, the British were completely taken by surprise when they beheld, the next morning, the fortifications which made Boston untenable. “Good God!” exclaimed General Howe, “these fellows have done more work in one night than I could have made my army do in three months. What shall I do?” At first he undertook to bombard the intrenchments, but his gunners could not fire so high, though they sunk the hind wheels of their cannon in the ground. Washington hoped they would attack him, in which case troops that were waiting on the other side of Boston would have assailed the city. “But the renowned Lord Percy Disappointed us,” wrote John Sullivan to John Adams, for he, instead of his Prospect Glass, took a multiplying Glass & viewed our people from the Castle, & made them fifty thousand, when, in fact, we had only sent on four thousand.” The result was that, to their humiliation, the whole British force, in great disorder and confusion, abandoned the city, leaving over two hundred cannons, thousands of muskets, and great stores of powder, lead, and other military necessities, and betook themselves to their fleet. So ended the siege of Boston.

With the commanders of the troops who occupied those decisive Dorchester Heights we need not now concern ourselves. Our business is with him who so efficiently and successfully organized and conducted the wagon train which bore the materials for the fortifications, John Goddard of Brookline. He was already well known in his own town as a patriot and had been appointed to various posts of service in the preparations for the Revolution. We find in the town records that on December 15, 1767, John Goddard was chosen one of five persons to “be a Committee to prepare a form for subscription against Receiving of those European superfluities and make Report” as to those “superfluities.” On the twentieth of November in that year Parliament had laid a duty on paint, paper, glass and tea imported into the colonies, and the Americans proposed to defeat it by simply going without those articles. On December 11, 1772, Mr. Goddard was one of a Committee of seven appointed “to take under consideration the Violation and Infringments of the Rights of the Colonists and of this Province in particular,” and “to be a Standing Committee of Communication and correspond with the Town of Boston and any other Town in the Subject of our Present Difficulties.” The grievances referred to are stated at length in the minutes of the twenty-eighth of the same month. As the sky grows darker with the clouds of war we find Mr. Goddard appointed (September 1, 1774) on another committee “to Ex amine into the state of Said Town as to Their Military preparations for War, in case of a Sudden attack from our Enemies”; and on the twenty-seventh made one of two delegates “to attend in the Provincial Congress, to be held at Concord, to meet the Delegates from the other Towns in the Province and unite with them in all Such Measures as shall Appear to you to have a tendency to promote the Welfare of this Province and to recover and Secure the first Rights and Liberties of America.” Again, on January 1, 1775, he is made 'one of a committee to see that the vote “To comply with the Recommendation as set forth by the Continental and Provindal Congress, be Duly Observed.”

We find also that at a meeting of the committee of safety at the house of Captain Stedman, in Cambridge, November 2, 1774, it was “Voted: unanimously, that Mr. John Goddard of Brookline be wagon master for the army, and that Captain White inform him of his choice, by the province;” and again, in records dated “Head Quarters, May 15, 1775,” “This is to certify, that Mr. John Goddard has been appointed by, the joint committee of safety and supplies as Wagon Master to this colony, to convey such articles of stores from one part of this colony to another as the public exigency may require, and that such other wagoners or drivers are to be employed as he shall recommend for that purpose.” It is proof of the efficiency and success of Mr. Goddard in this important service of transportation that it was recorded in the Orderly Book of Captain Abijah Wyman's company in Colonel William Prescott's regiment, on August 9, 1775, that “Mr. John Goddard is appointed by the Commander in Chief, Wagon Master General to the army of the twelve united Colonies and is to be obeyed as such.” He had power to seize such wagons and horses or oxen as he needed for the public service and assign prices for them.

Before this appointment he had evidently been known to General Washington as a reliable patriot for we read in the same book, under date of April 21, “That the two hogsheads of powder in the possession of Mr. Pigion be lodged with John Goddard at Brookline, for the use of the American troops,” and again, on April 24, “that General Thomas do send an officer, with a sufficient guard, to convey a mortar and ordnance stores to Mr. John Goddard in Brookline where the powder is now stored.” Before this the powder that went to Concord had been stored in some bushes on Mr. Goddard's farm, and it was related as remarkable, if not providential, that the lightning one stormy night struck and split the tree at the foot of which the powder was hidden without causing any explosion. It was soon found, however, that the place of hiding was becoming too well known, and the powder was carried to Concord, followed one unlucky day by the British. The cannons, however, remained and were carried around through Heath Street in Roxbury to Dorchester Heights, leaving the old barn which had sheltered them to stand as a witness to this day. Mr. Goddard was urged by General Washington to conduct the transportation of his army to New York, and to remain with him to the end of the war, in which case he would have had the rank of Lieutenant- Colonel to begin with but be answered that he could not leave his wife and children, and having aided in driving the enemy from his own province, resigned and spent the rest of his life upon his farm.

At this time Mr. Goddard had fourteen children, of whom the youngest was born three weeks after that famous moonlight march of his father. Two were born later. Of these sixteen all but one, a daughter, were the children of his second wife, Hannah Seaver. She was born July16, 1735, and died May 31, 1821. To have lived eighty-six years and to have borne fifteen children in less than twenty-five years argues a strong constitution, especially when we consider the labor and exposure which the faithful wives of our forefathers underwent upon their farms.

“I do not recollect,” says one of the sons, “there being more than one female assistant at one time in the house, unless when there was a nurse and sometimes a washerwoman one day in the week. In those days they baked all their bread, brewed their own beer, made their own soap, did all their sewing except making some new garments, knit their own stockings if they wore any, and often spun their own yarn, made the cloth for their shirts and sheets and even pocket handkerchiefs. The sleeved jackets and trousers were manufactured in the same family way; in making pocket handkerchiefs, the white linen was first made, though not very fine, and handed to the children, who tied shot up fancifully in it, and then dyed in the dye-pot in the corner of the fireplace; when done, washed and dried, we untied the shot, and behold the beautiful white rings made by the strings around the shot' through which the dye did not penetrate; to make the checked and striped shirts, the colored part was died in the same pot.” And “how often have I seen the anxious mother search the well, which was about eight feet deep and fed by a spring, and protected by no curb, when by reaching and stirring with a long stick bubbles would rise, which went far to convince her that the child was there and she suffered most excruciatingly, till the missing was found.”

Whether she had the experience of one of our more recent Brookline mothers, who bore nine children and had eight of them down with the measles at once, in four rooms, two in a room, we are not told. Her maternal methods were simple, if we may judge from the reply made to someone who asked what she did with so many children, that she “put leather aprons on them all and turned them all out to play.” All was not play, however, with the young Goddard's, for we are told of John, the eldest son, that before he was nine years old he had committed to memory and recited to Rev. Joseph Jackson the whole Book of Proverbs, with its thirty-one chapters and perhaps six thousand verses, and the one hundredth and nineteenth Psalm, which has one hundred and seventy-six verses. He came rightly by his love of the Bible, however, for his mother was the granddaughter of Deacon Benjamin White of the church in Brookline. Her mother, Hannah White, for whom she was named, died less than seven years after she was born, so that she had to leave her daughter's education, to other than her natural guardian; but whoever received her did her work well, for Hannah grew up to be much beloved and respected, and was long remembered after she• was gone. Like “the mother of Zebedee's children,” her life sank from public fame into the lives of her husband and children, but it was true then of America, as Napoleon afterwards said of France, that “what the country needed most was mothers.”

Of her fifteen children only seven reached their majority, not from lack of care, but from the inevitable circumstances of their life. “They were scorched by the flames of the great open fireplace,” says Mrs. Earle of the children of that day, “but four feet away they would almost freeze. In their bedrooms there was, of course, no heat. On the Sunday after birth, the new baby was taken to the meeting-house, which was often miles away, and in which it was so cold in winter that the squares of communion bread rattled on the silver plate and ice had to be broken in the christening bowl.” Of Judge Sewall's fourteen children but three survived him, a majority dying in infancy, and of fifteen children of his friend, Cotton Mather, but two survived their father. The medical practice of the day was not well developed, and the household medicines were apt to be harsh or utterly useless. The farmer's children fared better as to length of life than those of the Judge or the Parson.

The name Godard, though apparently French, is found in England before the Conquest, and is registered in Domesday Book as found in Wiltshire. There certainly lived in the thirteenth century Walter Godard Ville, who was levied upon by Henry III for horses and arms. His son dropped the last part of this name, and Godard continued henceforth to be the family title.

Our John Goddard came of a sturdy republican and militant stock. He was the great- grandson of William who emigrated to this country in 1665, and settled in Watertown, Mass. His father, Edward; was a wealthy farmer, educated at Oxford, and a commissioner under the Commonwealth. Most of his family fought with the King, but he chose the side of Parliament. It is supposed that William shared his father's political opinions and that it was persecution on this account that drove him to this country. If this be true, his love of free institutions cost him dear. According to the English law of that day, he was allowed to bring only five pounds in money with him, and the rest of his property, which he had stored in London, was burned in the great fire. He found himself, therefore, in straitened circumstances in a new land, and began to teach Latin and other branches of learning.

It was his third son, Joseph, born in London, who came to Brookline in 1670, to a part of it then included in Roxbury, and bought a strip of land extending from what is now Clyde Street to Jamaica Pond. To this he added, as deeds still extant show, fifty acres bought from Daniel Oliver in 1712, and in the same year fifty more from William Marean. On this land his descendants have lived ever since. There was a lane leading to Jamaica Plain and a cart road through the estate now owned by Mr. Moses Williams to what is now called Warren Street. This land passed to his fourth son, John, who, on his removal to Worcester in 1745, left the farm to John, the eldest son of his second wife, his first wife having had no children. This was the John Goddard of whom we have been speaking, and in whom the sturdy republican strain which was in his great-great-grandfather, Edward, of Cromwell's day and which sent his great grandfather, William, to this country, came once more into action. The fugitive from King Charles II avenged himself in the person of his great-grandson upon King George III. It was by this John Goddard that the older of the two houses was built in 1767, the more primitive one of 1680 having by this time earned an honorable discharge. The original clap-boards, fastened with English hand-cut nails, are still in their places.

While we have the family tree before us, let us trace out some of its later branches. The eldest son of the Revolutionary John, who bore the same name, was a delicate boy, though, like many a youth of the kind, he lived long and passed through much. We have seen what he could endure in the way of learning and reciting Scripture. Educated as a physician, he became a surgeon on one of our armed vessels, was captured with it, carried to a West Indian prison, almost died of a fever, escaped, was captured with the vessel to which he had swum, taken back to the same prison, escaped again, and reached home on a Sunday morning so changed that his own mother did not know him. This was doing fairly well for a “delicate” young man! He never fully recovered from this experience, but he married Susanna, daughter of John Heath of Brookline, and settled in Portsmouth, N. H. He was chosen United States Senator and Governor of the state, but declined, and advised his sons always to decline public office. After the death of his second wife, Jane Boyd, he married a daughter of President Langdon of Harvard College. He died in 1829 at the age of seventy- three.
Meantime, his younger brother Joseph had settled upon his father's farm and died there in 1846 at the age of eighty-five. He married Mary Aspinwall, by whom he had eleven children. The tenth of these, Abijah Warren Goddard, spent his long life of ninety-seven years upon the original farm, building the present home in 1857. He died August 12, 1900, honored and beloved, after having held many offices in the town and been deacon of the First Parish for forty-four years. His daughter, Mrs. Eliza Watson, and her daughter, Mrs. D. Wright, are the sixth generation to occupy the old farm, the latter continuing in many useful works the patriotic spirit of her line. It is interesting to think that this Goddard, with whom we have lived and talked, connects us directly, through his father, with the Revolution. Abijah's elder brother, Samuel Aspinwall Goddard, seems to have inherited in especial force the sturdy patriotic spirit of his English ancestors and of the Revolutionary John. Circumstances took him to England, where he became a naturalized citizen, but he was a fearless and persistent advocate of the Northern cause in a land where there was great need of defense and explanation. John Bright made special acknowledgment of the help he had received from this loyal American, and it is clear that he did much toward preventing the British from recognizing the Southern Confederacy.

The town records show that John Goddard was an active, patriotic and useful citizen. He was for a long series of years the moderator of the annual town meeting, being after 1779 always called Captain Goddard. He must have gone almost directly from Dorchester Heights to his farm, for on March 11 he was made one of the assessors of Brookline. On May 20 he was “Chosen to Serve for and Represent said Town in said Great & General Assembly,” and the purpose of appointing such a man is seen in the vote at once passed, “to advise the Person, if Chosen to Represent this Town in the next General Court, that if the Hon. Congress Should for the Safety of the American Colonies, Declare them Independent of the Kingdom of Great Britain, that we said inhabitants will Solemnly engage with our Lives and fortune to support them in the measure.” The ring of this vote makes one suspect that the sturdy John had a hand in forging it. He seems also to have been much interested in the church, for in nearly every case in which the town passed a vote concerning it, or the minister, Mr. Goddard was the one, or one of those, selected to execute the measure. The Parish records show that he was also frequently chosen one of the delegates to accompany the minister to ordinations or installations. He died April 13,1816.

John and Hannah Goddard are types of the men and women who made New England what it was and, in much that is best, what it is. One understands whence the strength came that drove England out of the country, when one thinks of the thousands of such households that were scattered over the eastern border of this great land, thinking not much about themselves and not realizing what an empire they were helping to found. We cannot safely prophecy what will come of these new streams of life which are pouring into our country from the other side of the ocean. Who can tell what ancient vigor and fineness may come back to the descendants of the Greeks and Romans, or to those of the barbarians who poured down from the north and dispossessed these stocks of the fair domains of southern and eastern Europe? But we trust that enough will remain of the old colonial English blood to preserve the ideals of freedom which were incarnated in men like John Goddard and not less in women like Hannah, his wife.

There is one word more, however, which I would like to add. The window which we dedicate today owes its presence here to a sentence in the discourse delivered in this house during the week of the bicentennial celebration of the founding of this town, on November 12, 1905: “John Goddard and Hannah, his remarkable wife,” I said, “ought to have a memorial window in this church, where their direct descendants still worship; and Isaac Gardner should have another.” There were two descendants of John Goddard in the congregation who were not connected with this parish, and they made up their minds that such a window should be placed here and, with the co-operation of others, here it is. I now repeat the second suggestion, that Isaac Gardner should also have a window. I do not know who his descendants are, but, like the warrior of old who drew his bow at a venture and hit a king, I throw out this thought in the hope that somewhere it may strike the right man or woman. Isaac Gardner commanded one of the three companies from Brookline who went to the battles of Lexington and Concord. They assembled in front of the old meeting-house, just this side of the present parsonage. He never returned and was one of the first martyrs to the cause of your liberty and mine. He lived on the Brighton road, now Chestnut Hill Avenue, and was active in this parish, being often mentioned in its records. He was a good soldier of Christ as well as of the colony of Massachusetts Bay. He ought to be commemorated here, and perhaps those who will see that this is done are now hearing these words. John Goddard, one of the heroes of Dorchester Heights and of the evacuation of Boston, has his window. There is one still left on the sunny side of this meeting-house. What name would be more fitly placed there than that of Isaac Gardner?

However, this may be, we thank today those who have set this memorial of John and Hannah Goddard. When I came here sixteen years ago, their descendant, Deacon Abijah Goddard, venerable with four-score and ten years of useful life, sat on my left of the broad aisle, and on my right still sit his daughter, granddaughter and great-grandson. In the course of years these too will vanish, and those who take their places will know little of their predecessors. In time, this memorial will also pass away, but, built into the very foundation of a mighty nation, will endure forever the lives of those that gave themselves for it when it began.

See also
National Register of Historic Places listings in Brookline, Massachusetts

References

Houses completed in 1767
Georgian architecture in Massachusetts
Houses in Brookline, Massachusetts
National Register of Historic Places in Brookline, Massachusetts
1767 establishments in Massachusetts
Houses on the National Register of Historic Places in Norfolk County, Massachusetts